Marie Daëms (1928–2016) was a French stage, film and television actress.  After studying at the Lycée Jules-Ferry in Paris, Daëms made her stage debut in 1947 and her first screen appearance in 1949. She was married to the actor François Périer between 1949 and 1959.

Selected filmography
 Le sorcier du ciel (1949)
 My Seal and Them (1951)
 L'Amour, Madame (1952)
 The Air of Paris (1954)
 Scènes de ménage (1954)
 Maid in Paris (1956)
 Irresistible Catherine (1957)
 Let's Be Daring, Madame (1957)
 Filous et compagnie (1957)
 Charming Boys (1957)
 Life Together (1958)
 The Journey (1959)
 We Will Go to Deauville (1962)
 Que personne ne sorte (1964)
 Alibis (1977)
 The Black Sheep (1979)
 Deux enfoirés à Saint-Tropez (1986)
 Every Other Weekend (1990)
 Those Who Love Me Can Take the Train (1998)

References

Bibliography
 Hayward, Susan & Vincendeau, Ginette . French Film: Texts and Contexts. Psychology Press, 2000.
 Petrucci, Antonio. Twenty Years of Cinema in Venice. International Exhibition of Cinematographic Art, 1952.

External links

1928 births
2016 deaths
French film actresses
French stage actresses
French television actresses
Actresses from Paris